Joseph Albo (c. 1380–1444) was a Jewish philosopher and rabbi who lived in Spain during the fifteenth century, known chiefly as the author of Sefer ha-Ikkarim ("Book of Principles"), the classic work on the fundamentals of Judaism.

Biography
Albo's birthplace is generally assumed to be Monreal del Campo, a town in Aragon.  This is based on Astruc ha-Levi's report of the religious debate held at Tortosa in 1413-14, which mentions Albo as one of the Jewish participants and notes he was the delegate of the congregation of Monreal. However, the Latin account of this debate makes no reference to this locality.

Heinrich Graetz believes that Albo could not have been less than thirty years of age when he was sent to take part in the disputation, and he accordingly places the date of Albo's birth not later than 1380. His date of death is given variously as 1444 (most likely) or 1430. He is mentioned, however, as preaching at Soria in 1433.

The use Albo makes of medical illustrations creates the presumption that he was adept in medical science, which suggests that he may have practiced medicine. He was versed to some degree in the writings of Arab Aristotelians. His teacher was Hasdai Crescas, author of Or Hashem. Opinions vary on whether Crescas was still alive when Sefer ha-Ikkarim was published.

Sefer ha-Ikkarim

Albo is best known for his philosophical work, Sefer ha-Ikkarim ("Book of Principles"), completed in 1425 in Soria.

References

 Philippe Bobichon, Sefer ha-'Iqqarim « Livre des Principes » III, 25 Un chapitre de la controverse judéo-chétienne dans l'Espagne du XV e siècle (texte hébreu traduction, commentaires), Madrid, CSIC, 2015 online
 Philippe Bobichon, "Polémique anti-chrétienne et théologie dans le Sefer ha-‘Iqqarim (« Livre des Principes ») de Joseph Albo (xve s.)" Yod 15/2010, pp. 115- 143 online

External links
Joseph Albo - (c. 1380 - 1445), Adventures in Philosophy

1380 births
1444 deaths
15th-century philosophers
Philosophers of Judaism
15th-century Aragonese rabbis
Jewish apologists